Francisco Guerrero Marín (July 7, 1951 – October 19, 1997) was a Spanish composer. He was born in Linares and died in Madrid.

During his lifetime, he completed several compositions, among which there are five major works for orchestra: Antar Atman (1980), Ariadna (1984), Sahara (1991), Oleada (1993) and Coma Berenices (1997). In 1981, he started working on the cycle Zayin on request by the Arditti Quartet. Another project was an orchestration of the piano cycle Iberia of the Spanish composer Isaac Albéniz. However, this work was still unfinished on his death.

The main aspect in Guerrero's work was the search for musical elements to match natural phenomena. In the scope of his musical work, he studied physical and mathematical principles, most notably the fractal geometry of Benoît Mandelbrot.

Works
Entire list of works: http://www.centrodedocumentacionmusicaldeandalucia.es/export/sites/default/publicaciones/pdfs/catalogo-guerrero.pdf

Facturas (1969) for ensemble
Da tagte es (1970) for organ
Lo menos importante (1971) for harpsichord and three tape recorders
Xénias Pacatas (1971–1972) for 18 strings
Diapsalmata (1972) for electronics
Oda (1973) for 9 instruments
Noa (1973) for two trumpets and two trombones
Lz Vox Eterna (1973) for two bass voices, four percussionists, and two tape recorders
Kineema (1973) for clarinet and piano
Ecce Opus (1973) for large orchestra
Agonica (1973) for wind quintet
Xenias Pacatas II (1974) for 2 guitars
Jondo (1974) for brass, percussion, voices and tape
Datura fastuosa (1974) for string orchestra
Anemos A (1975) for wind ensemble and percussion
Actus (1975) for wind ensemble and strings
Sobra la tumba de... (1975–1976) for violin, viola, 2 trombones and 14 strings
Op.1 Manual (1976) for piano
Concierto de camara (1978) for six instruments
Anemos C (1978) for 12 instruments
Anemos B (1977–1978) for twelve mixed voices a cappella
Acte préalable (1977–1978) for 4 percussionists
Ars Combinatoria (1980) for 6 instruments
Antar Atman (1980) for orchestra
Erótica (1978–1981) for Contraalto and Guitar
Vâda (1982) for 2 sopranos and 9 instruments
Pâni (1981–1982) for harpsichord
Zayin (1983) for string trio
Ariadna (1984) for 10 violins, 5 violas and 5 violoncellos
Têyas (1985) for 24 voices choir a cappella
Rhea (1988) for 12 saxophones
Zayin III (1989) for string trio
Zayin II (1989) for string trio
Nur (1990) for voices a capella
Cefeidas (1990) for electronics
Sahara (1991) for orchestra
Dunas (1991) for string orchestra
Delta Cephei (1991) for 2 clarinets, violin, viola and violoncello
Rigel (1993) for electronics
Oleada (1993) for string orchestra
Zayin V (1994) for string trio
Zayin IV (1994) for string quartet
Hyades (1994) for voice, flute, trombone, bass and electronics
Zayin VIIb (1995) for string trio
Zayin VI (1995) for solo violin
Coma Berenices (1996) for orchestra
Zayin VII (1996–1997) for string quartet

References

Further reading
 The Fractal Geometry of Nature, by Benoît Mandelbrot; W. H. Freeman, 1983;

Recordings

 Francisco Guerrero, Complete Orchestral Works. José Ramón Encinar, Orquesta Sinfonica de Galicia. col legno, WWE1CD20044
 Francisco Guerrero, Zayin (I-VII, VIIb). Arditti Quartet. Almaviva, DS-0127
 Francisco Guerrero, Chamber Music. Joan Cerveró, Grup Instrumental de València. C33001

External links
 
 Francisco Guerrero Marín's biography on Cdmc website
Mathématique et Expression. Conversation posthume avec Francisco Guerrero. J.M. Chouvel:http://www.centrodedocumentacionmusicaldeandalucia.es/export/sites/default/publicaciones/pdfs/mathematique-expression.pdf

1951 births
1997 deaths
People from Linares, Jaén
Spanish composers
Spanish male composers
Musicians from Andalusia
20th-century composers
20th-century Spanish musicians
20th-century Spanish male musicians